The Forum Party of Alberta was a political party in the Province of Alberta, Canada. The party was created on March 2, 1995.

It later became the Equity Party, which held its founding convention in May 2000.  The Equity Party did not nominate candidates in the 2001 election, and the 2004 election.

The Equity Party had five basic goals, social tolerance for all Albertans, fiscal accountability, grass roots accountability, including revenue sharing between riding associations, environmental responsibility and reforming the First Past the Post electoral system.

The Equity Party had an unusual way of developing their policy structure. They used an online forum that they called their online think tank to help foster and develop policy, and policy discussion. The party declared itself a new kind of political party, organized around the Internet and electronic communications. The Forum party got its name from the Internet Forum idea. The name was later changed to represent their policy platform. Party members referred to themselves as Equitists. The main reason for the name change was to avoid confusion with the Reform party.

The party struggled to gain traction throughout its life span. The centrist policies and unique low budget way of promoting itself did not capture the imagination or attention of many people. In 2001 Barry Pashak stepped down as leader and the website quietly disappeared. Emil van der Poorten, the man who replaced him as party president, seemingly became more interested in community activism and Edmonton municipal politics than reviving the party. The party was de-registered in 2004 under amended Elections Alberta rules that states a party must run one candidate in a provincial election. The party was deregistered.

Election results

Overall Results

Candidate results

By-election results May 21, 1996

Party Leaders
William Finn (1995 - 1997)
Emil van der Poorten (1997 - 2000)
Barry Pashak (2000 - 2001)
Brent Johner (2001 - 2003)
Emil van der Poorten (2003 - 2004)

Board of directors at dissolution
Emil van der Poorten Leader, Party Spokesperson
Bruce Hinkley Chief Financial Officer
Brent Johner Vice President

See also
List of Alberta general elections
List of Alberta political parties

External links
Emil van der Poorten in See Magazine 1997

Provincial political parties in Alberta
Political parties established in 1995
Political parties disestablished in 2004
Defunct political parties in Canada